This is a list of Huns (a Central Asian people who lived in Europe between the 4th and 6th centuries AD) and of people of Hunnish descent, sorted by field and name:

Military commanders
Tuldila (fl. 458), commander in the Western Roman Empire, of Hunnish descent
Uldin (died c. 412), military leader and ruler of the Huns, who defeated the Gothic magister militum Gainas, sending his head to Arcadius as a diplomatic gift

Politicians, ministers, ambassadors, religious figures
Edeko (fl. 449), prominent Hun, Attila's deputy and his ambassador to the Byzantine Empire (in 449), probably the father of Odoacer

See also
List of Xiongnu rulers (Chanyus)

References

Lists of people by nationality
Huns